Hot Wheels: Stunt Track Challenge is a video game developed by Climax Racing and published by THQ. It was released in November 2004 for PlayStation 2, Xbox, and Microsoft Windows. It is the ninth installment in the Hot Wheels series of video games. A Game Boy Advance port was developed by Razorback Developments, implementing many elements from the home console versions.

The game received mixed reviews from critics upon its release.

Gameplay
Stunt Track Challenge is a racing style arcade game that consists of drivers competing in stunt challenges and winning fast races to stay on the show. Sometimes, there are mini-games with special tasks, usually involving collecting icons in a limited amount of time.

Development and release
The game also had an online mode, local co-op and compatibility with the Game Boy Advance Game Link Cable.

Reception

Hot Wheels: Stunt Track Challenge received "mixed" reviews on all platforms according to video game review aggregator Metacritic.

Juan Castro of IGN gave the game 6.5 out of 10.

Alex Navarro of GameSpot gave Stunt Track Challenge 5.9 out of 10.

The game sold over 1.16 million copies worldwide, of which 700,000 in North America.

References

2004 video games
Game Boy Advance games
Hot Wheels video games
PlayStation 2 games
Racing video games
Science fantasy video games
THQ games
Video games based on toys
Video games scored by Allister Brimble
Video games developed in the United Kingdom
Xbox games
Windows games
Multiplayer and single-player video games